Mvomero is one of the six districts of the Morogoro Region of Tanzania.  It is bordered to the north by the Tanga Region, to the northeast by the Pwani Region, to the east and southeast by Morogoro Rural District and Morogoro Urban District and to the west by Kilosa District.

According to the 2002 Tanzania National Census, the population of the Mvomero District was 260,525.

Wards

The Mvomero District is administratively divided into 30 wards:

 Bunduki
 Luale
 Diongoya
 Doma
 Hembeti
 Kanga
 Kibati
 Kikeo
 Kweuma
 Langali
 Maskati
 Melela
 Mhonda
 Mlali
 Mtibwa
 Mkindo
 Mvomero
 Mzumbe
 Nyandira
 Tchenzema
 Mgeta
 Msongozi
 Mangaye
 Homboza
 Lubungo
 Dakawa
 Kinda
 Pemba
 Mziha
 Sungaji

Sources
 Mvomero District Homepage for the 2002 Tanzania National Census

References

Districts of Morogoro Region